The list below shows the leading Thoroughbred sire of racehorses in Japan for each year since 1924. This is determined by the amount of prize money won by the sire's progeny during the season.

 1924 - Ebor (1)
 1925 - Ebor (2)
 1926 - Ebor (3)
 1927 - Ebor (4)
 1928 - Ebor (5)
 1929 - Ebor (6)
 1930 - Chapel Brampton (1)
 1931 - Perion (1)
 1932 - Perion (2)
 1933 - Clackmannan (1)
 1934 - Clackmannan (2)
 1935 - Tournesol (1)
 1936 - Tournesol (2)
 1937 - Tournesol (3)
 1938 - Tournesol (4)
 1939 - Tournesol (5)
 1940 - Review Order (1)
 1941 - Mint d'Or (1)
 1942 - Diolite (1)
 1943 - Diolite (2)
 1944-45 - no racing in Japan
 1946 - Diolite (3)
 1947 - Theft (1)
 1948 - Theft (2)
 1949 - Theft (3)
 1950 - Theft (4)
 1951 - Theft (5)
 1952 - Kumohata (1)
 1953 - Kumohata (2)
 1954 - Kumohata (3)
 1955 - Kumohata (4)
 1956 - Kumohata (5)
 1957 - Kumohata (6)

 1958 - Rising Flame (1)
 1959 - Rising Flame (2)
 1960 - Rising Flame (3)
 1961 - Hindostan (1)
 1962 - Hindostan (2)
 1963 - Hindostan (3)
 1964 - Hindostan (4)
 1965 - Hindostan (5)
 1966 - Solonaway (1)
 1967 - Hindostan (6)
 1968 - Hindostan (7)
 1969 - Guersant (1)
 1970 - Never Beat (1)
 1971 - Partholon (1)
 1972 - Never Beat (2)
 1973 - China Rock (1)
 1974 - Tesco Boy (1)
 1975 - Tesco Boy (2)
 1976 - Partholon (2)
 1977 - Never Beat (3)
 1978 - Tesco Boy (3)
 1979 - Tesco Boy (4)
 1980 - Tesco Boy (5)
 1981 - Tesco Boy (6)
 1982 - Northern Taste (1)
 1983 - Northern Taste (2)
 1984 - Partholon (3)
 1985 - Northern Taste (3)
 1986 - Northern Taste (4)
 1987 - Northern Taste (5)
 1988 - Northern Taste (6)
 1989 - Northern Taste (7)
 1990 - Northern Taste (8)

 1991 - Northern Taste (9)
 1992 - Northern Taste (10)
 1993 - Real Shadai (1)
 1994 - Tony Bin (1)
 1995 - Sunday Silence (1)
 1996 - Sunday Silence (2)
 1997 - Sunday Silence (3)
 1998 - Sunday Silence (4)
 1999 - Sunday Silence (5)
 2000 - Sunday Silence (6)
 2001 - Sunday Silence (7)
 2002 - Sunday Silence (8)
 2003 - Sunday Silence (9)
 2004 - Sunday Silence (10)
 2005 - Sunday Silence (11)
 2006 - Sunday Silence (12)
 2007 - Sunday Silence (13)
 2008 - Agnes Tachyon (1)
 2009 - Manhattan Cafe (1)
 2010 - King Kamehameha (1)
 2011 - King Kamehameha (2)
 2012 - Deep Impact (1)
 2013 - Deep Impact (2)
 2014 - Deep Impact (3)
 2015 – Deep Impact (4)
 2016 – Deep Impact (5)
 2017 – Deep Impact (6)
 2018 – Deep Impact (7)
 2019 – Deep Impact (8)
 2020 – Deep Impact (9)
 2021 – Deep Impact (10)
 2022 – Deep Impact (11)

References
 tbheritage.com

See also
 Leading broodmare sire in Japan
 Leading sire in Australia
 Leading sire in France
 Leading sire in Germany
 Leading sire in Great Britain & Ireland
 Leading sire in North America
 Leading broodmare sire in Great Britain & Ireland
 Leading broodmare sire in North America

Horse racing in Japan